This is a list of World Heritage sites in France with properties of cultural and natural heritage in France as inscribed on UNESCO's World Heritage List or as on the country's tentative list. France accepted the Convention Concerning the Protection of the World Cultural and Natural Heritage on 27 June 1975, after which it could nominate properties on their territory to be considered for the World Heritage List.

Currently, 49 properties in France are inscribed on the World Heritage List. 42 of these are cultural properties, 6 are natural properties, and 1 is mixed. Four properties are transboundary properties. The first was added to the list in 1979 and the latest in 2019. Five properties were submitted in 1979. The tentative list of France contains 37 properties.

The names in the tables below are the names of the properties as used on the website of UNESCO. There are three different types of properties possible: cultural, natural, and mixed. Selection criteria i, ii, iii, iv, v, and vi are the cultural criteria, and selection criteria vii, viii, ix, and x are the natural criteria. The dates for the properties on the World Heritage List are the dates of inscription, the dates for the tentative list are those of submission. The numbers are the reference numbers as used by UNESCO, and they link directly to the description pages of the properties on the UNESCO website.

Properties on the World Heritage List

Properties submitted on the Tentative List 
Property names as submitted by France and year of inscription on Tentative List. Translation of site names provided in italics for reference purposes; official translation of site name proposed only once site is put forward for consideration on World Heritage List.

Sites mégalithiques de Carnac, 1996. Carnac megalithic sites
Cathédrale de Saint-Denis, 1996. Saint-Denis Cathedral
Rouen : ensemble urbain à pans de bois, cathédrale, église Saint-Ouen, église Saint Maclou, 1996. Rouen: timber-framed urban area, Rouen Cathedral, Basilica of Saint Ouen, Church of Saint Maclou
Château de Vaux-le-Vicomte, 1996. Vaux-le-Vicomte Castle
Les villes bastionnées des Pays-Bas du nord-ouest de l'Europe, 1996. Fortified cities of the Low Countries of north-western Europe
Montagne Sainte-Victoire et sites cézaniens, 1996. Mount Saint Victoire and Paul Cézanne sites
Ensemble de grottes à concrétions du Sud de la France, 2000. Concretion cave complexes in southern France
Parc national de la Vanoise, 2000. Vanoise National Park
Massif du Mont Blanc, 2000. Mont Blanc
La Camargue, 2002. The Camargue
Bouches de Bonifacio, 2002. Straight of Bonifacio
Parc national des Écrins, 2002. Écrins National Park
Parc national de Port-Cros, 2002. Port Cros National Park
Marais salants de Guérande, 2002. Guérande salt marshes
Le rivage méditerranéen des Pyrénées, 2002. Mediterranean shore of the Pyrenees Mountains
Rade de Marseille, 2002. Bay of Marseille
Les villes antiques de la Narbonnaise et leur territoire : Nîmes, Arles, Glanum, aqueducts, via Domitia, 2002. Roman Narbonensian cities and area: Nîmes, Arles, Glanum, aqueducts, via Domitia
Le chemin de fer de Cerdagne, 2002. Cerdagne railway
Office National d'Études et de Recherches Aérospatiales, Meudon, 2002. National Aerospace Research Centre, Meudon
Hangar Y, 2002. Hangar Y
Ancienne chocolaterie Menier à Noisiel, 2002. Former Menier chocolate factory in Noisiel
Centre ancien de Sarlat, 2002. Historic centre of Sarlat
Arsenal de Rochefort et fortifications de l'estuaire de la Charente, 2002. Rochefort arsenal and fortifications of the Charente Rivers estuary
Les Iles Marquises, 2010. Marquesas Islands
Nîmes, l'Antiquité au présent, 2012. Nîmes, from Antiquity to present
Aires volcaniques et forestières de la Martinique, 2014. Volcanic and forested areas of Martinique
 Metz Royal et Impériale, enjeux de pouvoir, confrontations stylistiques et identité urbaine, 2014. Royal and Imperial Metz, power plays, stylistic exchange and urban identity
Les Plages du Débarquement, Normandie, 1944, 2014. Allied landing beaches in Normandy, 1944
Sites funéraires et mémoriels de la Première Guerre mondiale (Front Ouest), 2014. World War One cemeteries and memorials (Western Front)
Cité de Carcassonne et ses châteaux sentinelles de montagne, 2017. City of Carcassonne and its mountain sentinel castles.
Le Charolais-Brionnais, paysage culturel de l'élevage bovin, 2018. Charolais-Brionnais region, a cultural landscape for cattle farming
Domaine de Fontainebleau : château, jardins, parc et forêt, 2020. Fontainebleau Castle, Gardens, Park and Forest
Les témoignages matériels de la construction de l’État des Pyrénées : la Co-principauté d’Andorre, 2021. The built heritage of the construction of a State in the Pyrenees: the Co-principality of Andorra

Location of inscribed sites

See also 
Tourism in France
List of World Heritage Sites in Western Europe

References 

 
France
World Heritage Sites
World Heritage Sites